Tyron Woodley (born April 17, 1982) is an American professional mixed martial artist. He is a former UFC Welterweight Champion who defended his title four times. A professional since 2009, Woodley also competed at Strikeforce and was an NCAA Division I collegiate wrestler for the Missouri Tigers, becoming a two-time All-American and Big 12 Conference champion.

Early life
Woodley was born and raised in Ferguson, Missouri. The eleventh of thirteen children, he was raised by his mother after his father left the family early in his life. In high school, he was a two-sport athlete, competing in American football and amateur wrestling. Woodley won the Missouri 4A Men’s State Championship in 2000 in the 160 lb weight class.

After graduating from McCluer High School in 2000, Woodley attended University of Missouri and joined their wrestling program. There, he became a two-time All-American; once in 2003 and again in 2005. Woodley graduated from the university in 2005 with a major in Agricultural Economics.

Mixed martial arts career
Woodley fought his first professional fight on February 7, 2009 against Steve Schnider. It was held by Headhunter Productions at the Holiday Inn Select Executive Center in Columbia, Missouri. Woodley won via submission in the first round.

Woodley's second professional bout was against Jeff Carstens on April 30, 2009. He won the bout via submission in the first round.

Strikeforce
Woodley made his Strikeforce debut against Sal Woods in St. Louis, Missouri. The fight was at the event Strikeforce: Lawler vs. Shields on June 6, 2009. Woodley won the fight by submission late in round one. After the win, Strikeforce signed Woodley to a six-fight deal.

Woodley made his second appearance for Strikeforce on the Strikeforce Challengers: Kennedy vs. Cummings card. He defeated Zach Light via submission in the second round.

On the Strikeforce Challengers: Woodley vs. Bears card, Woodley had his third fight for Strikeforce, defeating Rudy Bears via arm-triangle submission.

Woodley's next bout was against Nathan Coy at Strikeforce Challengers: Lindland vs. Casey in Portland, Oregon. He won via split decision.

On October 9, 2010, at Strikeforce: San Jose, Woodley defeated André Galvão via knockout midway in the first round.

Woodley fought Tarec Saffiedine on January 7, 2011, in Nashville, Tennessee at Strikeforce Challengers: Woodley vs. Saffiedine. Woodley won the fight via unanimous decision. After the win, Woodley was signed to a contract extension with Strikeforce.

At Strikeforce: Fedor vs. Henderson, Woodley replaced Evangelista Santos and fought Paul Daley. Woodley defeated Daley via unanimous decision.

Woodley then fought Canadian prospect Jordan Mein at Strikeforce: Rockhold vs. Jardine. Woodley won via split decision.

Woodley faced Nate Marquardt on July 14, 2012, at Strikeforce: Rockhold vs. Kennedy for the vacant Strikeforce Welterweight Championship. He lost the fight via KO in the fourth round.

Ultimate Fighting Championship

Debut
Woodley faced Jay Hieron on February 2, 2013, at UFC 156 in his promotional debut, replacing an injured Erick Silva. Woodley won the fight via KO at just 36 seconds of the opening round.

Woodley faced Jake Shields on June 15, 2013, at UFC 161. Woodley lost the fight via split decision.

Woodley next faced off against Josh Koscheck at UFC 167 on November 16, 2013. He won the fight via knockout in the first round. The win also earned him his first Knockout of the Night bonus award.

Woodley next faced former Interim Welterweight Champion Carlos Condit at UFC 171. Woodley won via TKO after Condit suffered a knee injury in the second round.

On April 8, 2014, Woodley's new eight-fight contract with the UFC was announced alongside his match against Rory MacDonald at UFC 174. He lost the fight via unanimous decision.

Woodley next faced Dong Hyun Kim on August 23, 2014, at UFC Fight Night 48, replacing Héctor Lombard. He won the fight via TKO early in the first round. The win also earned Woodley his first Performance of the Night bonus award.

Woodley faced Kelvin Gastelum on January 31, 2015, at UFC 183 in a catchweight bout after Gastelum failed to make the welterweight limit. He won the fight via split decision.

Woodley was expected to face Johny Hendricks on October 3, 2015, at UFC 192. It was announced on October 2, 2015, that Hendricks was forced out of the fight due to complications with weight cutting.

UFC Welterweight Championship
Woodley faced welterweight champion Robbie Lawler on July 30, 2016, in the main event at UFC 201. He won the fight via knockout halfway through the first round to claim the UFC Welterweight Championship. This win earned him the Performance of the Night award.

Woodley made his first title defense against Stephen Thompson on November 12, 2016, at UFC 205. The fight ended in a majority draw with two judges scoring the fight 47–47 and the third 48–47 in favor of Woodley. Subsequently, both fighters were awarded Fight of the Night bonus awards.

The rematch with Thompson took place on March 4, 2017, in the main event at UFC 209. It was another closely contested bout with Woodley winning via majority decision.

For his third title defense, Woodley faced Demian Maia on July 29, 2017, in the co-main event at UFC 214. He won the fight by unanimous decision. Woodley stated after the contest that he had torn his labrum in his right shoulder in the opening round. Woodley would later have reconstructive surgery to repair the damage.

Woodley next defended the UFC Welterweight Championship against Darren Till on September 8, 2018, at UFC 228. He won the fight via submission in the second round. This win earned him the Performance of the Night award. Woodley also received his Brazilian Jiu-Jitsu black belt in the cage from Din Thomas following his victory. Woodley also gave Till his first loss in MMA.

In the fifth defense of his welterweight title, Woodley faced Kamaru Usman on March 2, 2019, in the co-main event at UFC 235. Woodley was dominated for the entire fight and lost by unanimous decision, ending his nearly three-year reign as welterweight champion.

Post Championship
A rematch with Robbie Lawler was expected to take place on June 29, 2019, at UFC on ESPN 3. On May 16, 2019, it was reported that Woodley suffered a hand injury and was pulled from the fight.

Woodley was scheduled to face Leon Edwards on March 21, 2020, at UFC Fight Night: Woodley vs. Edwards. However, the restrictions related to COVID-19 forced Edwards to withdraw as the event was meant to be moved from London to the United States, and the event was subsequently postponed indefinitely.

Woodley faced Gilbert Burns on May 30, 2020, in the main event at UFC on ESPN: Woodley vs. Burns. Woodley would again be dominated for most of the fight and lose via unanimous decision.

Woodley fought at UFC Fight Night: Covington vs. Woodley against longtime rival Colby Covington on September 19, 2020. Similar to his past two fights, Woodley was dominated for four rounds, and eventually the bout was called as a technical knockout after he tapped out during the fifth round due to a rib injury.

Woodley faced Vicente Luque on March 27, 2021, at UFC 260. Uncharacteristically, Woodley came out swinging aggressively early into the bout, and after rocking Luque and being rocked himself multiple times on the feet, he was defeated by D'Arce choke in round one. This fight earned him the Fight of the Night  award. Weeks later, it was announced that Woodley had fought out his contract after eight years competing in the promotion.

Professional boxing career

Paul vs. Woodley 

Before the Jake Paul vs. Ben Askren main event took place, Woodley was involved in a backstage situation with Jake Paul and J'Leon Love, where he was mocked due to his inexperience in boxing and the result of Paul's bout against Woodley's long–time teammate Ben Askren was discussed. After Paul knocked out Askren, Woodley called out Paul. On May 31, 2021, news surfaced that Woodley had been scheduled to make his professional boxing debut against internet personality Jake Paul on August 29, 2021. Woodley became the first man to take Paul past the second round in his professional career, but ultimately lost by split decision. One judge scored the fight 77–75 for Woodley, while the other two judges scored it 77–75 and 78–74 in favor of Paul.

Paul vs. Woodley II 

On December 6, 2021, Woodley hopped in to replace Tommy Fury for a rematch with Jake Paul on December 18. After a back-and-forth bout, Woodley was knocked out in the sixth round. At the time of the stoppage, Woodley was behind on the scorecards 49–46 (twice) and 48–47.

Other ventures 
Woodley has pursued acting in his spare time and played roles in both Straight Outta Compton, Kickboxer: Vengeance and Sultan, the latter being an Indian movie directed by Ali Abbas Zafar. He also appears in several fight scenes of Escape Plan 2: Hades. Woodley also appeared on Season 5 of the Netflix show Cobra Kai.

Additionally, he hosts a podcast called "Morning Wood with Deez Nutz" and a weekly internet web show on TMZ called "The Hollywood Beatdown".

Personal life
Tyron has four children. He has said that his goal is to open a non-profit facility for troubled youths one day. When his hometown of Ferguson, Missouri engaged in civil unrest after the shooting of Michael Brown, Woodley publicly condemned the rioting and lootings that took place.

Championships and accomplishments

Mixed martial arts
Ultimate Fighting Championship
UFC Welterweight Championship (One time)
Four successful title defenses
Knockout of the Night (One time) vs. Josh Koscheck
Performance of the Night (Three times) vs. Dong Hyun Kim, Robbie Lawler and Darren Till 
Fight of the Night (Two times)
Strikeforce
2010 Rising Star of the Year
ULTMMA 
2009 Prospect of the Year

Wrestling
Missouri State High School Activities Association
MSHSAA All-State (1999, 2000)
National Collegiate Athletic Association
NCAA Division I All-American (2003, 2005)
Big 12 Conference Champion (2003)
National High School Coaches Association
NHSCA Senior All-American (2000)
Real Pro Wrestling
RPW 84 kg Northern Regional Championship (2006)
USA Wrestling
United States University Freestyle National Championship Runner-up (2006)

Mixed martial arts record

|-
|Loss
|align=center|19–7–1
|Vicente Luque
|Submission (brabo choke)
|UFC 260 
|
|align=center|1
|align=center|3:56
|Las Vegas, Nevada, United States
|
|-
|Loss
|align=center|19–6–1
|Colby Covington 
|TKO (rib injury)
|UFC Fight Night: Covington vs. Woodley
|
|align=center|5
|align=center|1:19
|Las Vegas, Nevada, United States
|
|-
|Loss
|align=center|19–5–1
|Gilbert Burns
|Decision (unanimous)
|UFC on ESPN: Woodley vs. Burns
|
|align=center|5
|align=center|5:00
|Las Vegas, Nevada, United States
|
|-
|  Loss
|align=center|19–4–1
|Kamaru Usman
|Decision (unanimous) 
|UFC 235
|
|align=center|5
|align=center|5:00
|Las Vegas, Nevada, United States
|
|-
|Win
|align=center|19–3–1
|Darren Till
|Submission (brabo choke)
|UFC 228
|
|align=center|2
|align=center|4:19
|Dallas, Texas, United States
|
|-
|Win
|align=center|18–3–1
|Demian Maia
|Decision (unanimous)
|UFC 214
|
|align=center|5
|align=center|5:00
|Anaheim, California, United States
|
|-
| Win
|align=center|17–3–1
|Stephen Thompson
|Decision (majority)
|UFC 209
|
|align=center|5
|align=center|5:00
|Las Vegas, Nevada, United States
|.
|-
|  Draw
| align=center|
| Stephen Thompson
| Draw (majority)
| UFC 205
| 
| align=center|5
| align=center|5:00
| New York City, New York, United States
|
|-
|  Win
| align=center|16–3
| Robbie Lawler
| KO (punches)
| UFC 201
| 
| align=center|1
| align=center| 2:12
| Atlanta, Georgia, United States
| 
|-
|  Win
| align=center| 15–3
| Kelvin Gastelum
| Decision (split)
| UFC 183
| 
| align=center| 3
| align=center| 5:00
| Las Vegas, Nevada, United States
| 
|-
|  Win
| align=center| 14–3
| Dong Hyun Kim
| TKO (punches)
| UFC Fight Night: Bisping vs. Le
| 
| align=center| 1
| align=center| 1:01
| Macau, SAR, China
| 
|-
|  Loss
| align=center| 13–3
| Rory MacDonald
| Decision (unanimous)
| UFC 174
| 
| align=center| 3
| align=center| 5:00
| Vancouver, British Columbia, Canada
| 
|-
|  Win
| align=center| 13–2
| Carlos Condit
| TKO (leg kick)
| UFC 171
| 
| align=center| 2
| align=center| 2:00
| Dallas, Texas, United States
| 
|-
|  Win
| align=center| 12–2
| Josh Koscheck
| KO (punches)
| UFC 167
| 
| align=center| 1
| align=center| 4:38
| Las Vegas, Nevada, United States
| 
|-
|  Loss
| align=center| 11–2
| Jake Shields
| Decision (split)
| UFC 161
| 
| align=center| 3
| align=center| 5:00
| Winnipeg, Manitoba, Canada
| 
|-
|  Win
| align=center| 11–1
| Jay Hieron
| KO (punches)
| UFC 156
| 
| align=center| 1
| align=center| 0:36
| Las Vegas, Nevada, United States
| 
|-
|  Loss
| align=center| 10–1
| Nate Marquardt
| KO (elbows and punches)
| Strikeforce: Rockhold vs. Kennedy
| 
| align=center| 4
| align=center| 1:39
| Portland, Oregon, United States
| 
|-
|  Win
| align=center| 10–0
| Jordan Mein
| Decision (split)
| Strikeforce: Rockhold vs. Jardine
| 
| align=center| 3
| align=center| 5:00
| Las Vegas, Nevada, United States
| 
|-
|  Win
| align=center| 9–0
| Paul Daley
| Decision (unanimous)
| Strikeforce: Fedor vs. Henderson
| 
| align=center| 3
| align=center| 5:00
| Hoffman Estates, Illinois, United States
| 
|-
|  Win
| align=center| 8–0
| Tarec Saffiedine
| Decision (unanimous)
| Strikeforce Challengers: Woodley vs. Saffiedine
| 
| align=center| 3
| align=center| 5:00
| Nashville, Tennessee, United States
| 
|-
|  Win
| align=center| 7–0
| André Galvão
| KO (punches)
| Strikeforce: Diaz vs. Noons II
| 
| align=center| 1
| align=center| 1:48
| San Jose, California, United States
| 
|-
|  Win
| align=center| 6–0
| Nathan Coy
| Decision (split)
| Strikeforce Challengers: Lindland vs. Casey
| 
| align=center| 3
| align=center| 5:00
| Portland, Oregon, United States
| 
|-
|  Win
| align=center| 5–0
| Rudy Bears
| Submission (arm-triangle choke)
| Strikeforce Challengers: Woodley vs. Bears
| 
| align=center| 1
| align=center| 2:52
| Kansas City, Kansas, United States
| 
|-
|  Win
| align=center| 4–0
| Zach Light
| Submission (armbar)
| Strikeforce Challengers: Kennedy vs. Cummings
| 
| align=center| 2
| align=center| 3:38
| Bixby, Oklahoma, United States
| 
|-
|  Win
| align=center| 3–0
| Salvador Woods
| Submission (brabo choke)
| Strikeforce: Lawler vs. Shields
| 
| align=center| 1
| align=center| 4:20
| St. Louis, Missouri, United States
| 
|-
|  Win
| align=center| 2–0
| Jeff Carstens
| Submission (rear-naked choke)
| Respect Is Earned: Brotherly Love Brawl
| 
| align=center| 1
| align=center| 0:48
| Oaks, Pennsylvania, United States
| 
|-
|  Win
| align=center| 1–0
| Steve Schnider
| TKO (submission to punches)
| Headhunter Productions: The Patriot Act 1
| 
| align=center| 1
| align=center| 1:09
| Columbia, Missouri, United States
|

Professional boxing record

Pay-per-view bouts

MMA

Boxing

NCAA record

Filmography

See also
List of male mixed martial artists
List of UFC bonus award recipients
List of UFC champions
Ultimate Fighting Championship Pound for Pound rankings

References

External links

Living people
People from St. Louis County, Missouri
American male mixed martial artists
Missouri Tigers wrestlers
Mixed martial artists from Missouri
Welterweight mixed martial artists
Mixed martial artists utilizing collegiate wrestling
Mixed martial artists utilizing freestyle wrestling
Mixed martial artists utilizing boxing
Mixed martial artists utilizing Brazilian jiu-jitsu
African-American mixed martial artists
American male sport wrestlers
Amateur wrestlers
American male boxers
American practitioners of Brazilian jiu-jitsu
People awarded a black belt in Brazilian jiu-jitsu
Ultimate Fighting Championship champions
Ultimate Fighting Championship male fighters
21st-century African-American sportspeople
20th-century African-American people
1982 births